Abu Alayej-e Olya (also Romanized as Abū ‘Alāyej-e ‘Olyā; also known as Albū ‘Alāyej-e Bālā and Albū ‘Alāyej-e ‘Olyā) is a village in Jarahi Rural District, in the Central District of Mahshahr County, Khuzestan Province, Iran. As of the 2006 census, its population was 363, in 61 families.

References 

Populated places in Mahshahr County